Alfred Ernest Harding (1861–1942) was an independent conservative Member of Parliament in New Zealand.

Political career

In 1905, Harding had joined the breakaway New Liberal Party led by Harry Bedford and Francis Fisher.

In 1935, he was awarded the King George V Silver Jubilee Medal.

References

Members of the New Zealand House of Representatives
1861 births
1942 deaths
New Liberal Party (New Zealand) MPs
Unsuccessful candidates in the 1905 New Zealand general election
Unsuccessful candidates in the 1908 New Zealand general election
New Zealand MPs for North Island electorates